The Devils Island Light is a Nova Scotia lighthouse located at the eastern shore entrance to Halifax Harbour on Devils Island, Nova Scotia. First lit in 1852, it was succeeded by a second lighthouse in 1877 which survives today. The lighthouse has influenced regional folklore and remains an important community landmark although it is currently neglected and threatened.

History 
In 1711, a map of Halifax harbour was designed by a French engineer De Labat and featured a 
thirty-seven acre island named "Isle Verte" or Green Island after all the trees. Rear Admiral Pullen records that on James Cook's charts in 1759 the island is called Devils Island, but on Thomas Backhouse's chart of "The Harbour of Halifax," 1798, it is called Devils or Rous's Island. According to H. W. Hewitt, a schoolteacher and author of numerous articles on the history of Eastern Passage, a group of Halifax sportsmen went to the island for a night and ended up staying a few days longer than planned after an episode of bad weather. After returning to dry land, when asked where they had been, they all replied that they "did not know unless it was the Devil's Island". But this is just one of the stories that accounts for the origin of the name; like many islands, its name has undergone a few changes through history.

Devils Island, situated in the Atlantic Ocean – amid shoals and other hazards for seafarers, was the cause of numerous shipwrecks. The residents often used their own fishing boats and risked their lives in attempts to rescue the crews of wrecked ships. In 1837, a wooden beacon painted white was erected on the southern point of the island as a navigational aid, but because it was only visible during the day time, in 1851 a Halifax group made up of merchants, traders, and sea mariners presented a petition to the lieutenant-governor for a lighthouse to be built which the Assembly approved. In 1852, an octagonal lighthouse with an accompanying mirrored light was constructed near the shore on the southwest corner of the island. In 1877, a second lighthouse was built 175 yards east of the first one. The western light "was open all round, while the eastern one was dark on its northern side" (Boileau, Historic Eastern Passage, 103). Both white lights were visible from a distance of thirteen miles. In 1949, the first lighthouse erected was demolished and the light in the second was changed to flashing red and was visible for thirteen miles. In 1959, it was changed to a flashing white and amber light and was visible for eleven miles. In 1967, an automatic beacon flashing white was installed making the lighthouse keeper unnecessary, and all permanent human habitation on the island ceased after this event.  Devils Island has been deserted for many years now and the remaining standing buildings, like the lighthouse keeper's house, have been exposed to yearly seasonal weather without any maintenance and show signs of great disrepair. While under the care of the Canadian Coast Guard, the cupola of this second lighthouse was dismantled and discarded on the beach.

Cultural Significance
Devils Island and its lighthouse have artistic and a cultural significance as the source of 
stories and songs of the sea. In 1928 Helen Creighton first heard folk stories with the motif of a sunken crew taking over a ship from the singing of Gordon Young on Devils Island : "A dozen dripping sailors...faces pale and wan moved before us till...the lighthouse shone its light" (Creighton, Bluenose Ghosts, 117).

Families in nearby Eastern Passage have a deep attachment which is especially felt by the many descendants of the families who were once residents of Devils Island and who now live in Eastern Passage and share a living connection to the history of this island as well as a vivid view plane of this iconic structure against sky and sea. Many Eastern Passage residents and descendants of Devils Island long to see a lighted tower on the island again.

Devils Island Light Society 
In 2009, a group of private citizens formed the Devils Island Light Society to express concern 
for the present condition and also the future of the lighthouse. It was the intention of the society to apply to have the Devils Island lighthouse included under Bill S-215 (the Heritage Lighthouse Protection Act) when the Bill came into force in May 2010. The Canadian Heritage Act designates and preserves historically significant lighthouses. It also requires that communities near the lights be consulted before changing, selling, transferring or demolishing any of the designated stations. The society fought an uphill battle against Coast Guard censure and warning that members were not allowed to approach the lighthouse to restore and paint the facade. Nevertheless, the society mounted a rigorous campaign to publicize the historical and cultural significance of this seafaring landmark and organized a petition to demonstrate public support for its mission to save the lighthouse and maintain it on the Island, in situ. Approximately 8,000 signatures were collected and presented to the federal committee having oversight of Canadian lighthouses.

See also
 List of lighthouses in Canada

Notes

References 
 Boileau, John. Historic Eastern Passage: Including Imperoyal, Shearwater, South East Passage, Cow Bay, McNab's Island, Lawlor's Island, and Devil's Island. Halifax, N.S.: Nimbus Publishing, 2007.
 Creighton, Helen. Bluenose Ghosts. Halifax, N.S.: Nimbus Publishing, 2009.
 Creighton, Helen. A Folk Tale Journey. Breton Books, Wreck Cove, Cape Breton Island, 1993.
 Hewett, H. W. "History of Devils Island". Dartmouth Patriot. 6 July 1901.
 Irwin, E. H. Rip. Lighthouses & Lights of Nova Scotia: A Complete Guide. Halifax, NS:  Nimbus Publishing, 2003.
 Jones, Lindsay. "Lights out for historic Devils Island lighthouse?". The Chronicle Herald [Halifax] 1 May 2009.
 Myrden, Judy. "Historic Lighthouse May Be Dimmed; Local Group Fights to save Devils Island Warning Beacon." The Chronicle Herald [Halifax] 14 April 2009.
 Pullen, Rear Admiral Hugh F. The Sea Road to Halifax: Being an Account of the Lights and Buoys of Halifax Harbour. Halifax, N.S.: Nova Scotia Museum, 1980.

External links
 Aids to Navigation Canadian Coast Guard

Lighthouses completed in 1852
Lighthouses in Nova Scotia
Buildings and structures in Halifax, Nova Scotia
1852 establishments in Nova Scotia